The Saint-François River is a right tributary of the St. Lawrence River in Quebec, Canada.

Its source is Lake Saint-François in Chaudière-Appalaches, southeast of Thetford Mines. It flows southwest towards Sherbrooke, where it changes course northwest towards Drummondville, and finally empties into the Saint Lawrence River near Pierreville. Its total length is 135 miles.

Etymology 
The river is named after Saint Francis Xavier (1506–1552) by the Jesuits, who explored the region under the French regime, and after François de Lauzon.

Geography 
Its course is also unusual, as it flows from northeast to southwest to branch off, halfway through, and continue its course from southeast to northwest.

The Saint-François River has its origins in the lake Saint-François and heads southwest towards Sherbrooke. Along the way, it crosses the lakes Lake Aylmer and Lake Louise as well as many municipalities.

In Sherbrooke, it receives the waters of the Massawippi River basin and the Magog River basin. It continues north-west, passing through the municipalities of Windsor, Richmond, Drummondville and from there outflows into the Saint Lawrence River at lake Saint-Pierre.

History 

The river has long been traveled by Native Americans; particularly the Abenakis. The Indian Reservation of Odanak, which today has a population of about 400, has existed since 1670. The Fort Crevier was also built in 1687 by the river. A temporary Jesuit mission was established at Coös for the Abenaki living in the Connecticut River valley or near the Kennebec River. When the Abenaki mission Saint-François-de-Sales located on the Chaudière River moved to Odanak, the village took the latter's name, "Saint-François”. Odanak is located on the banks of the Saint-François River, about 10 kilometers east of lake Saint-Pierre.

References

Appendices

Related Articles 
 Grand lac Saint François 
 Lake Saint-François 
 Lake Aylmer
 Lake Louise (Quebec)
 Lake Saint-Pierre
 List of rivers of Quebec

External links 
 Management Committee of the Saint-François River Watershed (COGESAF)

Rivers of Estrie
Tributaries of the Saint Lawrence River
Rivers of Chaudière-Appalaches
Rivers of Centre-du-Québec